The 1964 All England Championships was a badminton tournament held at Wembley Arena, London, England from 1 to 4 April 1964.

Final results

Men's singles

Section 1

Section 2

Women's singles

Section 1

Section 2

References 

 https://eresources.nlb.gov.sg/newspapers/Digitised/Article/straitstimes19640403-1.1.16.aspx
 https://eresources.nlb.gov.sg/newspapers/Digitised/Article/straitstimes19640405-1.2.94
 https://eresources.nlb.gov.sg/newspapers/Digitised/Article/straitstimes19640405.2-1.109

All England Open Badminton Championships
All England Open Badminton Championships
All England Open Badminton Championships in London
All England Open Badminton Championships
All England Open Badminton Championships
All England Open Badminton Championships